The Délémontez-Desjardins D.01 'Ibis' is a French ultralight monoplane designed by Jean Délémontez for amateur construction, derived from the Jodel D.11.

Specifications

References

External links
 

1980s French civil utility aircraft
Homebuilt aircraft
Single-engined tractor aircraft
Low-wing aircraft
Aircraft first flown in 1985